The 1896–97 Scottish Second Division was won by Partick Thistle with Dumbarton finishing bottom.

Table

References

Scottish Football Archive

Scottish Division Two seasons
2